The 2022 Piala Emas Raja–Raja, also known as the 2022 Piala Emas Raja–Raja in Malay, will be held from 1 October to 12 November 2022 at four different host venues namely Perlis, Kelantan, Johor and Selangor in Malaysia. MISC are the defending champions.

The Piala Emas Raja–Raja is one of the oldest and prestigious tournaments in the world with its first edition dating back to 1922. His Royal Highness the Regent of England Prince of Wales visited the East and this tournament was held in celebration in Singapore by Malaya's national footballing body Football Association of Malaysia.

Teams
The participating teams usually include representatives of the state teams of Malaysia. Sixteen teams will compete for the trophy in this edition.

The sixteen teams are divided into a groups of four, and they will play in a single round-robin format. The top two teams of each group will advance into the knockout stage which will be played in a single elimination format.

  Kelab Kilat TNB
  Malacca
  Negeri Sembilan
  Angkatan Tentara Malaysia
  Terengganu Jakim FC
  Kelantan
  Pahang
  Bomba Malaysia
  Selangor
  Kedah
  MySPRM-ACeIO
  Kuala Lumpur
  PDRM
  Perak
  Perlis
  Kedah
  Penang

Venues

Round and draw dates

Group stage

Group A

Group B

Group C

Group D

Knock-out stage

Quarter-finals

Semi-finals

Finals

Winners

References

Piala Emas Raja–Raja seasons
2022 in Malaysian football